Marjorie Lea Larney (born January 4, 1937, in Brooklyn, New York is a retired American track and field athlete known for throwing events.  She represented the United States in the javelin throw at the 1952 Olympics, finishing 13th after being in 8th place after the qualifying round.  She was only 15 years old at the time.  She returned to the Olympics in 1956 to place 11th.  Later she attended Queens College.  She won the National Championships in the javelin five times, in 1952 and 1957–60, as well as the 1952 Olympic Trials, by almost 3 meters (10 feet).  She also won the National Championships in the discus throw in 1954 and was the first American in 1955.  She represented the Queens Mercurettes for most of her career.  She won a silver medal in the javelin and a bronze medal in the discus at the 1959 Pan American Games.  She had finished out of the medals at the 1955 Pan American Games.

Larney later moved to Oakland, California.  She continued throwing into Masters age groups, setting the American W50 records in the shot put and discus multiple times, finally at the 1987 TAC National Championships in Springfield, Oregon in 1987.  Her discus record lasted until 1991, when it was improved by Vanessa Hilliard.

References

1937 births
Living people
Olympic track and field athletes of the United States
American female javelin throwers
American female discus throwers
Sportspeople from Brooklyn
Athletes (track and field) at the 1952 Summer Olympics
Athletes (track and field) at the 1956 Summer Olympics
Pan American Games track and field athletes for the United States
Pan American Games medalists in athletics (track and field)
Athletes (track and field) at the 1955 Pan American Games
Athletes (track and field) at the 1959 Pan American Games
Pan American Games silver medalists for the United States
Pan American Games bronze medalists for the United States
Track and field athletes from California
Medalists at the 1959 Pan American Games
Track and field athletes from New York City
21st-century American women